The Newfoundland station was a formation or command of, first, the Kingdom of Great Britain and, then, of the United Kingdom's Royal Navy. Its official headquarters varied between Portsmouth or Plymouth in England where a squadron of ships would set sail annually each year to protect convoys and the British fishing fleet operating in waters off the Newfoundland coast and would remain for period of approximately six months based at St. John's Harbour. In 1818 the station became a permanent posting headquartered at St John's. It existed from 1729 to 1825.

History

The Commodore-Governor was both a British Government and a Royal Navy official who was commander-in-chief of the annual fishing convoy which left England each spring, sometimes from Portsmouth and other times from Plymouth, to fish off Newfoundland: the fleet were tasked with protecting the fishing convoys from harm. They were also responsible for administrative and judicial functions, including assisting the fishing admirals in Britain in maintaining admiralty law and order and compiling the annual report on the fish stocks for the British government. From 1729 to 1775 the officer appointed was usually of Commodore rank; however the station's increasing importance after that date led to appointments of more senior flag officers.

The squadron stayed in Newfoundland for approximately four to six months annually. How long they remained depended on the orders they received from the Admiralty, according to the ships' condition. The fleet usually arrived off Newfoundland in July and August, generally returning to England, via the Lisbon Station, towards the end of October. Bypassing the horrendous weather conditions prevalent in the Atlantic at that time of year and escorting the British fishing vessels were important considerations in when the squadron returned. In spite of these problems, the naval administration continued to grow throughout the 18th century. By 1818, the Newfoundland Colony had a sufficiently large permanent population to warrant having a full-time resident governor. The station's responsibilities were merged into the North America Station in 1825 when a full-time civilian governor was appointed.

Commanders

See also 
 Fishing admiral

Notes

References 
 
Miller, Nathan. Broadsides: The Age of Fighting Sail, 1775-1815 . New York: John Wiley & Sons, Inc. 2000.
Rodger, N.A.M. The Command of the Ocean: A Naval History of Britain, 1649-1815. New York and London: W.W. Norton and Company, 2004.

External links
 http://morethannelson.com/Royal Navy Stations

Commands of the Royal Navy
Military units and formations disestablished in 1825